The Atrauli Gharana is a Hindustani music apprenticeship fraternity (orignal gharana), founded by four brothers from the Gauharbani tradition who moved to Atrauli from Gwalior in the late-18th century. The gharana is best known for its influence and association with the Jaipur-Atrauli and Agra gharanas. 

This tradition acquired its celebrated status as its representatives, like Alladiya Khan, Faiyaz Khan, and Vilayat Hussain Khan, grew with acclaim in the 20th century. The gharana is known for its distinctive vocal aesthetics, raga repertoire, and technical aptitude.

History
The gharana was formed in the 18th century by four brothers - Hidayat Khan, Mughul Khan, Karim Hussain Khan, and Jabbar Khan - who were musicians that settled in Atrauli from Gwalior at the invitation of its Nawab.

Unlike the Agra Gharana, which comes from the Nauharbani tradition, and the Jaipur-Atrauli Gharana, which comes from the Dagarbani tradition, the Atrauli Gharana emerged from the Gauharbani tradition.

Lineage
The following family trees are based on reports by Vilayat Hussain Khan.

Ancestral Lineage

Prominent Musicians
 Mehboob Khan "Daraspiya"
 Puttan Khan
 Alladiya Khan
 Faiyaz Hussain Khan
 Vilayat Hussain Khan

References

Bibliography

Vocal gharanas
Aligarh district